The Methodist Episcopal Church South in Mount Sterling, Kentucky is a historic church at the junction of E. Main and N. Wilson Streets.  It was built in 1883 and added to the National Register of Historic Places in 1991.

It is a two-story brick building with a gable roof and a three-story entry tower.

Gateway Regional Arts Center
Gateway Regional Arts Center, also known as The GRAC, is an art center in Mt. Sterling, Kentucky. It is affiliated with the Montgomery County Council for the Arts. The center is located at 
101 East Main Street in downtown Mount Sterling.

The Arts Center hosts exhibits and classes. The building is a readapted former First United Methodist Church built in 1883. It is listed on the National Register of Historic Places. The Arts Center includes a library and gallery space.

In 2017 the venue hosted SoapCon,
a conference celebrating soap making.

References

Methodist churches in Kentucky
Churches on the National Register of Historic Places in Kentucky
Gothic Revival church buildings in Kentucky
Churches completed in 1883
19th-century Methodist church buildings in the United States
Churches in Montgomery County, Kentucky
National Register of Historic Places in Montgomery County, Kentucky
1883 establishments in Kentucky
Mount Sterling, Kentucky